Harmon "Gene" Jeffress (born October 18, 1948) is an American politician. A member of the Democratic Party, he serves as a member of the Arkansas Senate, representing District 25 from 2003 to 2013.

Career
Jeffress earned his bachelor's degree in music education from the University of Arkansas, Monticello, in 1971. He is a former teacher.

Jeffres served in the Arkansas House of Representatives from 1999 to 2003. He joined the Arkansas Senate in 2003. He was ineligible to run for re-election to the State Senate in 2012 due to term limits.

Jeffress ran in the 2012 elections for the United States House of Representatives, representing Arkansas's 4th congressional district. He and Q. Byrum Hurst Jr. defeated D. C. Morrison in the May 22 Democratic primary and advanced to the June 12 primary runoff election. Jeffress defeated Hurst in the runoff and faced Republican Tom Cotton in the general election on November 6, 2012, losing the race to Cotton.

Personal
Jeffress and his wife, Cynthia, have three children. They reside in Louann, Arkansas. His brother, Jimmy Jeffress, was also a member of the Arkansas Senate.

References

External links
 
 Official Campaign Facebook Page 
 Official Arkansas State Senate website of Senator Gene Jeffress
 Project Vote Smart legislative profile
 Project Vote Smart biography of Senator Gene Jeffress
Campaign Contributions: 2008 2006 2004 2002 2000

1948 births
Living people
Democratic Party members of the Arkansas House of Representatives
Democratic Party Arkansas state senators
University of Arkansas at Monticello alumni
People from Ouachita County, Arkansas
American educators